Frédéric Fitting (12 September 1902 – 18 October 1998) was a Swiss épée and foil fencer. He competed in the Summer Olympic Games of 1920, 1924, 1928, and 1936. His brother, Édouard Fitting, and sister, Emma Fitting, were also Olympic fencers.

References

External links
 

1899 births
1998 deaths
Swiss male épée fencers
Olympic fencers of Switzerland
Fencers at the 1920 Summer Olympics
Fencers at the 1924 Summer Olympics
Fencers at the 1928 Summer Olympics
Fencers at the 1936 Summer Olympics
Sportspeople from Geneva
Swiss male foil fencers